The 1986 FBI Miami shootout occurred on April 11, 1986, in Miami-Dade County, Florida, U.S. (the specific area was incorporated as Pinecrest in 1996), when a small group of field agents for the FBI attempted to apprehend William Russell Matix and Michael Lee Platt, who were suspected of committing a series of violent crimes in and around the Miami metropolitan area.

Although they had partially surrounded the suspects after maneuvering them off a local road, the agents involved quickly found their firepower was outmatched by the weapons which Matix and Platt had in their vehicle. During the gun battle which ensued, Platt in particular was able to repeatedly return fire despite sustaining multiple hits. Two Special Agents died from their wounds, while five other agents were injured by gunfire. The shootout ended when both Matix and Platt were killed.
 
The incident is infamous as one of the most violent episodes in the history of the FBI and is often studied in law enforcement training. The scale of the shootout led to the introduction of more effective handguns, primarily switching from revolvers to semi-automatics, in the FBI and many police departments around the United States.

Background

Michael Lee Platt (February 3, 1954 – April 11, 1986) and William Russell Matix (June 25, 1951 – April 11, 1986) met while serving in the U.S. Army at Fort Campbell, Kentucky.

Matix first served in the U.S. Marine Corps from 1969 to 1972, working as a cook (MOS 3371) in the officers' mess, serving in Hawaii and Okinawa from April 1970 to March 1971 and April 1971 to March 1972 respectively. He was honorably discharged July 7, 1972, achieving the rank of Sergeant. He enlisted in the U.S. Army on August 10, 1973, serving with the military police under the 101st Airborne Division in Fort Campbell, Kentucky. He served as a Military Police Officer and Squad Leader; Guard Supervisor for the Post Stockade and finally Patrol Supervisor before his honorable discharge August 9, 1976.

Platt enlisted in the Army 27 June 1972 as an infantryman. While in basic training, Platt applied for Army Airborne Ranger Training and subsequently entered Air Assault School at Fort Campbell, Kentucky. On completion of air assault school, Platt was assigned to the Military Police Unit. It was in this unit that he met and served with Matix. This is also where he met his first wife, Regina Lylen. He was honorably discharged in 1979.

Both men's former wives had died under violent circumstances. Matix's wife, Patricia Mary ( Buchanich) Matix, and a female co-worker, Joyce McFadden, both cancer researchers, were found stabbed to death on December 30, 1983, at Riverside Methodist Hospital in Columbus, Ohio, where both women worked. Both were found murdered in the hospital laboratory. They had been bound and gagged with their throats slashed. Matix reportedly told investigators he suspected Platt had carried on an affair with his wife. Matix was a suspect in the murders but was never charged.

After his wife's death, Matix moved to Florida at Platt's urging, and the two founded Yankee Clipper Tree Trimming Service, a landscaping and tree removal business. In May 1985, Matix married Christy Lou Horne, who moved out of the house two months later when Matix became enraged after learning she was pregnant. She would give birth to their son after Matix's death.

On December 21, 1984, Platt's wife, Regina, whom he had married nine years earlier in 1975, was found dead from a single shotgun blast to the mouth. Her death was ruled a suicide. He married his second wife, Brenda Horne, in January 1985.

Before embarking on their crime spree, neither Platt nor Matix had a criminal record. At the time of Platt's killing, his second wife, Brenda,  claimed to have had no idea that her husband and his friend were armed robbers.

On October 5, 1985, Platt and Matix murdered 25-year-old Emilio Briel while he was target shooting at a rock pit. The pair stole Briel's car and used it to commit several robberies. Briel's remains were found in March 1986 but not identified until May. On October 10, 1985, five days after killing Briel, Platt and Matix attempted to rob a Wells Fargo armored truck that was servicing a Winn-Dixie supermarket. After ordering him to freeze, one of the pair shot a guard in the leg with a shotgun while the other fired a handgun and shoulder weapons from the getaway vehicle. Two other guards returned fire, but neither Platt nor Matix was wounded. No money was taken in the botched robbery, but the injured guard later died from his wound. A few weeks later, on November 8, 1985, the two robbed the Professional Savings Bank in Miami, taking $41,469 in three Wells Fargo Armored Car Company money bags that had been delivered that morning.

They resumed their robberies on January 10, 1986, by attacking a Brinks Armored Car Company courier as he opened the back door of his truck at Barnett Bank in Miami. The attack was initiated by one of them shooting the guard in the back with a large gauge shotgun. Both approached the wounded guard and shot him twice more with a military type .223 caliber weapon described by witnesses as an AR-15 or M16 style rapid firing rifle. Afterwards, they escaped with $54,000 in the Chevrolet they had stolen from Emilio Briel. A civilian followed them from the scene and witnessed them switch to a white Ford F-150 pickup truck but lost contact thereafter. The guard survived the shooting, but was left with over 100 shotgun pellets in his body.

On March 12, they robbed and shot Jose Collazo as he was target shooting at a rock pit in the Florida Everglades, leaving him for dead and stealing his black Chevrolet Monte Carlo. Collazo survived the shooting and walked three miles to get help.

One week later, on March 19, 1986, at 9:30 a.m., carrying a short barrel pump shotgun and a military type shoulder weapon, possibly a Ruger Mini-14, they robbed the Barnett Bank branch. This was the same bank where they had shot and robbed the Brinks Armored Car courier a few months earlier. $8,338 was stolen. The suspects fled in Collazo's vehicle.

The shootout

At 8:45 a.m on Friday April 11, 1986, a team of FBI agents led by Special Agent Gordon McNeill assembled at a Home Depot to initiate a rolling stakeout searching for the black 1979 Chevrolet Monte Carlo (Collazo's stolen car). The agents did not know the identity of the suspects at the time. They were acting on a hunch that the pair would attempt a robbery that morning. A total of 14 FBI agents in 11 cars participated in the search. Eight of these FBI agents took part in the shootout and were deployed as follows:

 Supervisory Special Agent Gordon McNeill (a 20-year veteran)
 Special Agent Richard Manauzzi (a 15-year veteran) 
 Special Agent Benjamin Grogan (a 25-year veteran), with Special Agent Jerry Dove (a 4-year veteran)
 Special Agent Edmundo Mireles Jr., with Special Agent John Hanlon (a 23-year veteran)
 Special Agent Gilbert Orrantia (a 4-year veteran), with Special Agent Ronald Risner (an 18-year veteran).

Around 9:30 a.m., agents Grogan and Dove spotted the suspect vehicle, and began to follow. Two other stakeout team cars joined them, and eventually an attempt was made to conduct a traffic stop of the suspects, who were forced off the road following collisions with the cars of FBI agents Grogan/Dove, agents Hanlon/Mireles, and agent Manauzzi. These collisions sent the suspect car nose first into a tree in a small parking area in front of a house at 12201 Southwest 82nd Avenue, pinned between a parked car (on its passenger side) and Manauzzi's car on the driver side.

Of the eight agents at the scene, two had Remington 870 shotguns in their vehicles (McNeill and Mireles), three were armed with Smith & Wesson Model 459 9mm semi-automatic pistols (Dove, Grogan, and Risner), and the rest (six) were armed with Smith & Wesson revolvers; two had .357 Magnums and five had .38 Specials. Two of the agents had backup .38 Special revolvers (Hanlon and Risner); both would use them at some point during the fight.

The initial collision that forced the suspects off the road caused some unforeseen problems for the agents, as the FBI vehicles sustained damage from the heavier, older car driven by Matix. Just prior to ramming the Monte Carlo, Manauzzi had pulled out his service revolver and placed it on the seat in anticipation of a shootout, but the force of the collision flung open his door, and according to reports, his weapon either went flying out the door or was thrown to the floor. 

Hanlon lost his .357 Magnum service revolver during the initial collision, though he was still able to fight with his Smith & Wesson Model 36 backup weapon. The collision knocked off Grogan's glasses, and there is speculation his vision was so bad that he was unable to see clearly enough to be effective (a claim disputed by the FBI's medical director, who stated that Grogan's vision was "not that bad"). Grogan is credited with landing the first hit of the gunfight, wounding Matix in the forearm as he leaned out of the Monte Carlo to fire the shotgun at Grogan and Dove.

Manauzzi was unable to recover his revolver and was wounded in the head and back by a shotgun blast, thought to be from Matix. McNeill fired over the hood of Manauzzi's car but was wounded by return fire from Platt. Platt then fired his rifle at Mireles who was running across the street to join the fight. Mireles was hit in the left forearm, creating a severe wound. Platt then pulled back from the window, giving Matix opportunity to fire. Due to collision damage, Matix could only open his door partially, and fired one shotgun round at Grogan and Dove, striking their vehicle. Matix was then shot in the right forearm. McNeill returned fire with six shots from his revolver, hitting Matix with two rounds in the head and neck. Matix apparently was knocked unconscious by the hits and fired no more rounds. McNeill was then shot in the hand and, due to his wound and blood in his revolver's chambers, could not reload.

As Platt climbed out of the passenger side car window, one of Dove's 9mm rounds hit his right upper arm and went on to penetrate his chest, stopping an inch away from his heart. The autopsy found Platt's right lung had collapsed and his chest cavity contained 1.3 liters of blood (haemothorax), suggesting damage to the main blood vessels of the right lung. Of his many gunshot wounds, this wound was the primary one responsible for Platt's eventual death. The car had come to a stop against a parked vehicle, and Platt had to climb across the hood of this vehicle, an Oldsmobile Cutlass. As he did so, he was shot a second and third time, in the right thigh and left foot. The shots were believed to have been fired by Dove.

Platt chose a position by the passenger side front fender of the Cutlass. He fired a .357 Magnum revolver at agents Ronald Risner and Gilbert Orrantia, and was shot a fourth time when turning to fire at Hanlon, Dove, and Grogan. The bullet, fired by Orrantia's revolver, penetrated Platt's right forearm, fractured the radius bone and exited the forearm. This wound caused Platt to drop his revolver. It is estimated that Platt was shot a fifth time shortly afterwards, this time by Risner. The bullet penetrated Platt's right upper arm, exited below the armpit and entered his torso, stopping below his shoulder blade. The wound was not serious.

Platt fired one round from his Ruger Mini-14 at Risner's and Orrantia's position, wounding Orrantia in the left shoulder with shrapnel created by the bullet's passage, and two rounds at McNeill. One round hit McNeill in the neck, causing him to collapse and leaving him paralyzed for several hours. Platt then apparently positioned the Mini-14 against his shoulder using his uninjured left hand.

Dove's 9mm pistol was rendered inoperative after being hit by one of Platt's bullets. Hanlon fired at Platt and was shot in the hand while reloading. Grogan and Dove were kneeling alongside the driver's side of their car. Both were preoccupied with getting Dove's weapon working and did not detect that Platt was aggressively advancing upon them. Platt rounded the rear of their car and killed Grogan with a shot to the chest, shot Hanlon in the groin area, and then killed Dove with two shots to the head. Platt then entered the Grogan/Dove car in an apparent attempt to flee the scene. As Platt entered Grogan and Dove's car, Mireles, able to use only one arm, fired the first of five rounds from his pump-action shotgun, wounding Platt in both feet. At an unknown time, Matix had regained consciousness and he joined Platt in the car, entering via the passenger door. Mireles fired four more rounds at Platt and Matix, but hit neither.

Around this time, Metro-Dade police officers Rick Frye, Leonard Figueroa and Martin Heckman arrived. Heckman covered McNeill's paralyzed body with his own. Frye assisted Hanlon.

Platt's actions at this moment in the fight have been debated. A civilian witness described Platt leaving the car, walking almost 20 feet and firing at Mireles three times at close range. Mireles does not remember this happening. Officer Heckman does not remember Platt leaving the Grogan/Dove car. Risner and Orrantia, observing from the other side of the street, stated that they did not see Platt leave the car and fire at Mireles. However, it is known for certain that Platt pulled Matix's Dan Wesson revolver at some point and fired three rounds.

Platt attempted to start the Grogan/Dove car. Mireles drew his .357 Magnum revolver, moved parallel to the street and then directly toward Platt and Matix. Mireles fired six rounds at the suspects. The first round missed, hitting the back of the front seat. The second hit the driver's side window post and fragmented, with one small piece hitting Platt in the scalp. The third hit Matix in the face, and fragmented in two, with neither piece causing a serious wound. The fourth hit Matix in the face next to his right eye socket, traveled downward through the facial bones into the neck, where it entered the spinal column and severed the spinal cord. The fifth hit Matix in the face, penetrated the jaw bone and neck and came to rest by the spinal column. Mireles reached the driver's side door, extended his revolver through the window, and fired his sixth shot at Platt. The bullet penetrated Platt's chest and bruised the spinal cord, ending the gunfight.

The shootout involved 10 people; two suspects and eight FBI agents. Of the 10, only one, Special Agent Manauzzi, did not fire any shots (his firearm was thrown from the car in the initial collision), while only one, Special Agent Risner, was able to emerge from the battle without a wound. The incident lasted under five minutes yet approximately 145 shots were exchanged.

Toxicology tests showed that the abilities of Platt and Matix to fight through multiple traumatic gunshot wounds and continue to battle and attempt to escape were not achieved through any chemical means. Both of their bodies were drug-free at the time of their deaths.

Aftermath

A subsequent FBI investigation placed partial blame for the agents' deaths on the lack of stopping power exhibited by their service handguns. While some agents were equipped with 9mm semi- automatic pistols, most had revolvers, which made up the majority of the weapons used in the fight. The FBI soon began a search for a more powerful cartridge to issue to all agents. Noting the difficulties of reloading a revolver while under fire, the FBI specified that agents should be armed with box magazine-fed semi-automatic pistols. This incident contributed to the increasing trend for law enforcement agencies to switch from revolvers to semi-automatics across the United States.

In the aftermath, the FBI initially chose the S&W Model 1076 chambered for the 10mm Auto round, but its sharp recoil proved too much for most agents to control effectively, and a special reduced velocity loading was developed; commonly referred to as the "10mm Lite" or "10mm FBI". Soon afterwards Smith & Wesson developed a shorter cased cartridge based on the 10mm, the .40 S&W. This became more popular than its parent due to the ability to chamber in standard frame semi-automatic pistols initially designed for the 9mm Parabellum.

Other issues were brought up in the aftermath of the shooting. Despite being on the lookout for two violent felons who were known to use firearms during their crimes, only two of the FBI vehicles contained shotguns (in addition to Mireles, McNeill had a shotgun in his car, but was unable to reach it before or during the shootout), and none of the agents were armed with a rifle. Only two of the agents were wearing ballistic vests, and the armor they were wearing was standard light body armor, designed to protect against handgun rounds, not the .223 Remington rounds fired by Platt's Mini-14 rifle. The other six agents involved in the stakeout in five vehicles had additional weaponry including Remington shotguns, Heckler & Koch MP5 submachine guns, and M16 rifles, but did not reach the shootout in time to participate.

Weaponry and wounds

Agents

Killed in action
 Benjamin Grogan: Smith & Wesson Model 459 9mm semi-automatic pistol, nine rounds fired. Killed by a .223 gunshot wound to the chest.
 Jerry Dove: Smith & Wesson Model 459 9mm semi-automatic pistol, 20+ rounds fired. Killed by two .223 gunshot wounds to the head.

Wounded in action
 Richard Manauzzi: lost control of weapon in the initial vehicle collision, no shots fired. Minor wounds from shotgun pellets.
 Gordon McNeill: Smith & Wesson Model 19 .357 Magnum revolver (not FBI issue, but personally owned .357's and .38's could be approved for carry by supervisors, same applies with Mireles's Smith & Wesson Model 686), six rounds .38 Special +P fired. Seriously wounded by .223 gunshot wounds to the right hand and neck.
 Edmundo Mireles: Remington 870 12-gauge pump-action shotgun, five rounds of 00 buckshot fired; .357 Magnum revolver; Smith & Wesson Model 686, six rounds .38 Special +P fired. Seriously wounded by a .223 gunshot wound to the left forearm.
 Gilbert Orrantia: Smith & Wesson (model unknown, likely a Smith & Wesson Model 13, as it was an issued weapon at the time) .357 Magnum revolver, 12 rounds .38 Special +P fired. Wounded by shrapnel and debris produced by a .223 bullet near miss.
 John Hanlon: Smith & Wesson Model 36 .38 Special revolver, five rounds .38 Special +P fired. Seriously wounded by .223 gunshot wounds to the right hand and groin.

Unwounded
 Ronald Risner: Smith & Wesson Model 459 9mm pistol, 14 rounds fired, Smith & Wesson Model 60 .38 Special revolver, one round .38 Special +P fired.

Culprits
William Matix: Smith & Wesson Model 3000 12-gauge pump shotgun, one round of #6 shot fired. Killed after being shot six times.
Michael Platt: Ruger Mini-14 .223 Remington semi-automatic rifle with folding stock, at least 42 rounds fired, Smith & Wesson Model 586 .357 Magnum revolver, three rounds fired, Dan Wesson .357 Magnum revolver, three rounds fired. Killed after being shot 12 times.

Lawsuit
After the shooting, the families of Jerry Dove and Benjamin Grogan sued the estates of Platt and Matix under the RICO statute for damages. The lawsuit was dismissed because the families did not allege the "kind of recovery that RICO was designed to afford."

Memorial
In 2001, the Village of Pinecrest, Florida, which incorporated in 1996, honored the two fallen agents by co-designating a portion of Southwest 82nd Avenue as Agent Benjamin Grogan Avenue and Agent Jerry Dove Avenue. Street signs and a historical marker commemorate the naming of the roadway in Grogan and Dove's honor.

Dove, a West Virginia native, had Jerry Dove Drive named after him in Clarksburg, West Virginia, where the FBI Criminal Justice Information Services Division is located. He earned degrees from both West Virginia University and Marshall University.

In 2014, the FBI Miami field office moved to its new home in Miramar, Florida, dedicating the two towers of the new office space in memory of Dove and Grogan in a ceremony in April 2015. The first floor contains a memorial to Dove and Grogan. Every year on April 11, the FBI Miami office holds a fallen agent ceremony in honor of Dove, Grogan, and all FBI agents killed in the line of duty.

Media adaptations
 In 1988, NBC produced the made-for-television movie In the Line of Duty: The F.B.I. Murders depicting the circumstances leading up to and including the shootout, one of several films in the In the Line of Duty series produced during the 1980s and 1990s. Michael Gross portrayed William Matix and David Soul portrayed Michael Platt. Ronny Cox portrayed Ben Grogan, and Jerry Dove was portrayed by Bruce Greenwood.
 An episode of the short-lived TV series FBI: The Untold Stories featured a portrayal of the shootout.
 The event is the subject of an episode of the Discovery Channel's series The FBI Files sub-titled "Firefight", originally aired: March 2000.
 In 2012, Investigation Discovery aired an episode of Real Vice Miami that recounts the shootout in detail. Rey Hernandez portrayed William Matix and Nestor Lao portrayed Michael Platt. Robb Erwin portrayed Ben Grogan and Jerry Dove was portrayed by Alexis Aguilar. The program includes first-person commentary by retired FBI Special Agents Gil Orrantia and John Hanlon, who both survived the gunfight.

See also

 North Hollywood shootout
 Norco shootout
 2021 Sunrise, Florida shootout

Notes

References

External links
 Shootout Scene from In the Line of Duty
 FBI Hall of Honor
 Detailed article from Firearms Tactical
 
 The Ultimate After Action Report! at The Gun Zone
 Agents Dove and Grogan Avenue, Pinecrest, FL 
 FBI inquiry into the incident
 Real Vice Miami: The Bloodiest Day

1986 in Florida
1986 mass shootings in the United States
1986 murders in the United States
1980s crimes in Florida
1980s in Miami
April 1986 crimes
Attacks in the United States in 1986
Bank robberies
Conflicts in 1986
Deaths by firearm in Florida
Federal Bureau of Investigation
Law enforcement operations in the United States
Mass shootings in Florida
Robberies in the United States